Aleh Slautsin (born 21 April 1986) is a Ukrainian and Belarusian professional football player who is currently playing as a beach soccer and futsal player. He is a member of Belarus national beach soccer team.

Career
He played for Crimean amateur clubs from 2006 until 2007. In 2008, he switched to futsal and in 2010 he moved to Belarus. Since 2013, he began switching between futsal and beach soccer depending on a season.

External links

1986 births
Living people
Belarusian footballers
Ukrainian footballers
Association football forwards
Ukrainian expatriate footballers
Expatriate footballers in Belarus
FC Ihroservice Simferopol players
FC Hvardiyets Hvardiiske players
FC Krymteplytsia Molodizhne players
FC Vitebsk players
Beach soccer players
Ukrainian men's futsal players
Belarusian men's futsal players
Sportspeople from Simferopol